Jaique Ip Wan-in MH (born 15 January 1980) is a Hong Kong amateur snooker player.

Biography
Ip won the silver medal at the 2006 IBSF World Championships in Amman, Jordan, after she lost 5–0 in the final against Wendy Jans. In 2007 she reached the semi finals. Ip also represented Hong Kong in the 2007 Asian Indoor Games and won a bronze medal in the women's snooker event. In 2008, Ip became the WLBSA world doubles champions with Pam Wood, beating Chris Sharpe and Laura Alves in the final.

Jaique Ip won the Gold Medal as a member of the women's six reds team in the snooker competition at the 2010 Asian Games. Also in 2010, she was runner-up for the second time in the IBSF World Women's Snooker Championship, losing 0–5 to Ng On Yee.

On the Women's world snooker circuit, she has won several individual and doubles events, and reached her highest ranking of 3 in 2006.

She was awarded the Medal of Honour by the government of Hong Kong in 2011 for "her outstanding achievements in international snooker competitions."

Career Highlights

Individual

Team

Hong Kong Championships 
Snooker

Pocket Billiards (pool)

Notes

References

External links
Player Profile – Jaique Ip Wan Women's World Snooker.
Player: Jaique Ip Wan In WPBSA Tournament Manager

Living people
1980 births
Hong Kong snooker players
Place of birth missing (living people)
Asian Games medalists in cue sports
Cue sports players at the 2010 Asian Games
Female snooker players
Asian Games gold medalists for Hong Kong
Medalists at the 2010 Asian Games